Daniel Abenzoar-Foule (born 4 September 1981) is a retired French-born athlete who competed internationally for Luxembourg in the sprinting events. He represented that country at the 2005 World Championships and 2006 World Indoor Championships without qualifying for the second round.

He holds the Luxembourgian records in the 100 metres, as well as the indoor 60 and 200 metres.

Competition record

Personal bests
Outdoor
100 metres – 10.41 (+1.7 m/s) (Tomblaine 2006) =NR
200 metres – 20.89 (0.0 m/s) (Tomblaine 2006)
Indoor
60 metres – 6.76 (Moscow 2006) NR
200 metres – 21.12 (Luxembourg 2006) NR

References

1981 births
Living people
Luxembourgian male sprinters
Luxembourgian people of French descent